May Zin Nwe (born 7 March 1995) is a Burmese footballer who plays as a goalkeeper for the Myanmar women's national team.

References

1995 births
Living people
Women's association football goalkeepers
Burmese women's footballers
People from Mandalay Region
Myanmar women's international footballers